was a Japanese mathematician at Kyoto University working in analysis and topology. He suggested the Lakes of Wada to Kunizo Yoneyama, who wrote about them and named them after Wada.

Publications

References

1882 births
1944 deaths
20th-century Japanese mathematicians